Barumbado is a 1990 Filipino action film directed by Willie Milan.

Plot
Eric was an orphan and a fearless drug dealer who had an affair with Mona-lisa who cares for him since he was young but he caught eye on her step daughter. Her husband discovered the affair and he kills her while Eric was trying to escape and killing his enemies along the way.

Cast
 Robin Padilla as Eric
 Monica Herrera
 Lani Lobangco
 Pinky de Leon
 Michael de Mesa as Cpl. Gonzales
 Bomber Moran
 Val Iglesia as Johnny
 Romeo Rivera as Ignacio
 Jun Hidalgo
 July Hidalgo
 Ivan Duval
 Edward Luna
 Eric Lorenzo
 Ramon Recto
 Rudy Ramirez
 Rolly Banzil
 Polly Cadsawan
 Bong Varona

Awards and recognition
The film received a 1991 FAMAS Award nomination for Best Actor for Robin Padilla.

Box office
The action movie was one of the biggest hit of 1990 and pave the stardom of Robin Padilla

References

External links
 Barumbado at the Internet Movie Database

1990 films
1990 action films
Philippine action films
Filipino-language films
Tagalog-language films
Films directed by Willy Milan